The Europe/Africa Zone was one of the three zones of the regional Davis Cup competition in 1999.

In the Europe/Africa Zone there were four different tiers, called groups, in which teams competed against each other to advance to the upper tier. The top two teams in Group III advanced to the Europe/Africa Zone Group II in 2000, whereas the bottom two teams were relegated to the Europe/Africa Zone Group IV in 2000.

Participating nations

Draw
 Venue: Sini-Valge Tennis Club, Tallinn, Estonia
 Date: 9–13 June

Group A

Group B

1st to 4th place play-offs

5th to 8th place play-offs

Final standings

  and  promoted to Group II in 2000.
  and  relegated to Group IV in 2000.

Round robin

Group A

Armenia vs. Lithuania

Georgia vs. Kenya

Armenia vs. Kenya

Georgia vs. Lithuania

Armenia vs. Georgia

Kenya vs. Lithuania

Group B

Estonia vs. Zambia

Moldova vs. Monaco

Estonia vs. Monaco

Moldova vs. Zambia

Estonia vs. Moldova

Monaco vs. Zambia

1st to 4th place play-offs

Semifinals

Armenia vs. Estonia

Lithuania vs. Moldova

Final

Estonia vs. Lithuania

3rd to 4th play-off

Armenia vs. Moldova

5th to 8th place play-offs

5th to 8th play-offs

Georgia vs. Zambia

Kenya vs. Monaco

5th to 6th play-off

Georgia vs. Monaco

7th to 8th play-off

Zambia vs. Kenya

References

External links
Davis Cup official website

Davis Cup Europe/Africa Zone
Europe Africa Zone Group III